Andrei Alexandrovich Suraikin (20 October 1948 -28 September 1996) was a Russian pair skater. With partner Liudmila Smirnova, he was the 1972 Olympic silver medalist.

Career 
Suraikin began figure skating in 1957 and became a member of the USSR National Team in 1968. He trained at Spartak in Leningrad.

Suraikin competed with Liudmila Smirnova, coached by Maya Belenkaya. Smirnova and Suraikin won the silver medal at the 1972 Winter Olympics. In 1972 Suraikin was awarded the Medal For Labour Heroism.

In 1972 Suraikin paired with Natalia Ovchinnikova for a few seasons before retiring to coach. He was one of the first coaches for Larisa Selezneva and Oleg Makarov.

Results
(with Smirnova)

Results
(with Ovchinnikova)

1974 Spartakiada results used for 1974 Soviet Nationals

References 

1948 births
1996 deaths
Russian male pair skaters
Olympic figure skaters of the Soviet Union
Olympic silver medalists for the Soviet Union
Soviet male pair skaters
Figure skaters at the 1972 Winter Olympics
Figure skaters from Saint Petersburg
Spartak athletes
Olympic medalists in figure skating
World Figure Skating Championships medalists
European Figure Skating Championships medalists
Medalists at the 1972 Winter Olympics
Universiade medalists in figure skating
Universiade gold medalists for the Soviet Union
Competitors at the 1970 Winter Universiade